This is a list of prominent Sudanese writers.

Novelists and short story writers 

 Leila Aboulela (born 1964)
 Abdelaziz Baraka Sakin (born 1963)
 Malkat Ed-Dar Mohamed (1920–1969)
 Bushra Elfadil (born 1952), also poet
 Ibrahim Ishaq (1946–2021)
 Ali El-Makk (1937–1992), also translator and poet
 Jamal Mohammed Ibrahim, also poet
 Jamal Mahjoub (born 1960), British writer with Sudanese roots
 Rania Mamoun (born 1979)
 Ra'ouf Mus'ad (born 1937), also connected with Egypt
 Hamed al-Nazir (born 1975)
 Tayeb Salih (1929–2009)
 Sabah Sanhouri (born 1990)
 Mansour El Souwaim (born 1970)
 Amir Taj al-Sir (born 1960)
 Hammour Ziada (born 1977)

Poets

 Rashad Hashim (1902–1948)
 Muhammad Ahmad Mahgoub (1908–1976)
 Al-Tijani Yusuf Bashir (1912–1937)
 Gely Abdel Rahman (1931–1990)
 Salah Ahmed Ibrahim (1933–1993)
 Muhammed El-Faytori (1936–2015)
 Ibrahim 'Ali Salman (1937–1995)
 Abed Elrahim Abu Zakrra (1943–1989)
 Mohammed Abdul-Hayy (1944–1989)
 Mahjoub Sharif (1948–2014)
 Al-Saddiq Al-Raddi (born 1969)
 Mohammed Abdalbari (born 1985)
 Safia Elhillo (born 1990)
 K.Eltinaé (born 1985)
 Najlaa Eltom (born 1975)

Political writers
Abel Alier (born 1933)
Fatima Ahmed Ibrahim (1933–2017)
Sadiq al-Mahdi (1936–2020)
Abdel Khaliq Mahjub (died 1971)
Muhammad Ibrahim Nugud (1930–2012)
Muhammad Sa'id al-Qaddal (1935–2008)

Satirical writers

Jaafar Abbas

Islamic reformist writers

Abdullahi Ahmed An-Na'im (born 1946)
Mahmoud Mohamed Taha (1909–1985)
Hassan al-Turabi (1932–2016)

Journalists, literary critics and editors

Mohammed Taha Mohammed Ahmed (died 2006)
Abdul Raheem Glailati
Alfred Taban (born 1957)
Adil Babikir

See also 
 List of Sudanese people
Sudanese literature

Sudanese
Writers